Flossmoor is a village in Cook County, Illinois, United States. The population was 9,704 at the 2020 census. Flossmoor is approximately 24 miles south of The Loop/Downtown Chicago. It is closely tied to neighboring Homewood, sharing a high school and park district.

History
Although Flossmoor's founding and settlement can be traced to the 19th century, the city was first recognized as an affluent community in the 1920s when it became known as a cultural and recreational mecca of elite country clubs and stately golf courses. 

The 1920 PGA Championship and the Western Open golf tournaments of 1906 and 1912 were held in town. Flossmoor was incorporated as a village in 1924. In the years since, Flossmoor has gained recognition from area real estate and tourist concerns as the "status" suburb of south/southwest suburban Chicago. By the 1970s, Flossmoor had transitioned from a white Protestant community to the home of many Jewish Americans and Italian Americans. As of the 2010s, Flossmoor's population is predominantly African American.

Geography
Flossmoor has a station on the Metra Electric Main Line, which provides access to the Chicago Loop and the University of Chicago.

Demographics
As of the 2020 census there were 9,704 people, 3,391 households, and 2,499 families residing in the village. The racial makeup of the village was 58.81% African American, 31.11% White, 0.22% Native American, 1.95% Asian, 0.09% Pacific Islander, 1.62% from other races, and 6.20% from two or more races. Hispanic or Latino of any race were 4.76% of the population.

There were 3,391 households, out of which 60.72% had children under the age of 18 living with them, 63.20% were married couples living together, 7.87% had a female householder with no husband present, and 26.30% were non-families. 20.82% of all households were made up of individuals, and 15.07% had someone living alone who was 65 years of age or older. The average household size was 3.23 and the average family size was 2.74.

The village's age distribution consisted of 23.9% under the age of 18, 8.0% from 18 to 24, 18% from 25 to 44, 31.4% from 45 to 64, and 18.6% who were 65 years of age or older. The median age was 45.1 years. For every 100 females, there were 93.7 males. For every 100 females age 18 and over, there were 87.3 males.

The median income for a household in the village was $107,271, and the median income for a family was $119,836. Males had a median income of $80,609 versus $57,873 for females. The per capita income for the village was $56,195. About 4.0% of families and 10.0% of the population were below the poverty line, including 10.2% of those under age 18 and 3.2% of those age 65 or over.

Note: the US Census treats Hispanic/Latino as an ethnic category. This table excludes Latinos from the racial categories and assigns them to a separate category. Hispanics/Latinos can be of any race.

Government
Flossmoor is in Illinois's 2nd congressional district. It has an elected mayor, Michelle Nelson, and elected village trustees, as well as a professional village manager, Bridget Wachtel.

Education

Children in grades K-8, attend schools under the jurisdiction of public school district 161.  School District 161 has four elementary schools, Western Avenue, Serena Hills, Flossmoor Hills, and Heather Hill, all of which serve students in grades K-5. After attending elementary school, students go to Mardell M. Parker Junior High School, which serves children in grades 6–8.

The majority of students in the area  then go on to attend the local public high school, Homewood-Flossmoor High School (School District #233), which is a three-time recipient of the U.S. Department of Education's Blue Ribbon Award for excellence.

Flossmoor is home to Infant Jesus of Prague School, a private, Roman Catholic K-8 school operated by the Infant Jesus of Prague Parish. IJP, as the school is known, is a two-time winner of the U.S. Department of Education's Blue Ribbon Award.

Notable people
Nnedi Okorafor
George Shultz
Beryl Sprinkel
Ed Derwinski
George Stigler
Buddy Guy
John Dean
Michael Beschloss
Stephen Douglas Johnson
George Nolfi
Andy Tennant
Xavier Fulton
Brian Kerwin
Philip Hart Cullom
Jason Benetti

References

External links

Village of Flossmoor official website

Villages in Illinois
Villages in Cook County, Illinois
Chicago metropolitan area
Populated places established in 1924
1924 establishments in Illinois
Majority-minority cities and towns in Cook County, Illinois